Cheverny is a commune in the French department of Loir-et-Cher, administrative region of Centre-Val de Loire.

Population

Sights
The commune is the site of the Château de Cheverny.

See also
Communes of the Loir-et-Cher department

References

Communes of Loir-et-Cher